Kentucky Route 399 (KY 399) is a  state highway in the U.S. state of Kentucky. The highway connects mostly rural areas of Owsley and Lee counties with Vincent, Idamay, and Heidelberg.

Route description
KY 399 begins at an intersection with KY 30 in Vincent, within the north-central part of Owsley County. It travels to the north-northwest and curves to the north-northeast. It begins paralleling Duck Fork and curves to the north-northwest before entering Lee County. KY 399 heads to the north-northeast and curves to the north-northwest. It enters Idamay, where it crosses over Duck Fork and has a brief concurrency with KY 587. The two highways cross over Duck Fork and then split. The highway resumes its north-northwesterly routing, now along the western edge of Daniel Boone National Forest. It crosses over Duck Fork twice and curves to the northwest, where Duck Fork merges into Sturgeon Creek. The highway begins paralleling that creek, curves to the north-northeast, and enters the national forest proper. It curves to the north-northwest and crosses over the Kentucky River on the Heidelberg Bridge. It crosses over some railroad tracks of CSX and curves to the west-northwest before entering Heidelberg. There, it curves to the north and leaves the community. The highway heads to the north-northeast and curves to the north-northwest. It heads in an easterly direction and meets its northern terminus, an intersection with KY 52.

Major intersections

See also

References

0399
Transportation in Owsley County, Kentucky
Transportation in Lee County, Kentucky